Moleyns may refer to:

Adam Moleyns (died 1450), English bishop, lawyer, royal administrator and diplomat
Baron Moleyns, a title in the Peerage of England created in 1455 and merged with Baron Hungerford
Thomas Moleyns, Member of Parliament
William Moleyns (1378–1425), English politician, member of the Parliament of England